John Joseph Michels (February 15, 1931 – January 10, 2019) was an American football offensive lineman who played for the University of Tennessee (1950–1952) and in the National Football League (1953). In 1952, he was a consensus first-team All-American. In 1996, Michels was enshrined in the College Football Hall of Fame.  He is best known for coaching the offensive line of the Minnesota Vikings every year from 1967-1993 with the exception of 1984 when he coached the running backs.

1959-1966 Winnipeg Blue Bombers (OL)
1967-1983 Minnesota Vikings (OL)
1984 Minnesota Vikings (RB)
1985-1993 Minnesota Vikings (OL)

See also
 1952 College Football All-America Team

References 

1931 births
2019 deaths
All-American college football players
Players of American football from Philadelphia
American football offensive guards
Tennessee Volunteers football players
Philadelphia Eagles players
College Football Hall of Fame inductees